Tatenda Paul Maturure (born 14 August 1988) is a Zimbabwean professional basketball player for Mercenaries of the Manicaland Basketball Association (MBA).

Club career
Maturure has spent a large part of his career with the Harare City Hornets in Zimbabwe. He has also played for Raiders and JBC.

In 2018, he joined the Soweto Panthers of the Basketball National League in South Africa and was named the league's most valuable player (MVP) after winning a championship.

In 2021, Maturure was named the MVP of the Decade by the Basketball Union of Zimbabwe (ZUB).

National team career
Maturure plays for the Zimbabwean national team. He was one of the team's top scorers at AfroBasket 2015.

References

External links 
RealGM profile

1988 births
Living people
Sportspeople from Harare
Zimbabwean men's basketball players
Shooting guards
Small forwards
Soweto Panthers players